The Ntabankulu Local Municipality council consists of thirty-eight members elected by mixed-member proportional representation. Nineteen councillors are elected by first-past-the-post voting in nineteen wards, while the remaining nineteen are chosen from party lists so that the total number of party representatives is proportional to the number of votes received. In the election of 1 November 2021 the African National Congress (ANC) won a majority of thirty-one seats.

Results 
The following table shows the composition of the council after past elections.

May 2011 election

The following table shows the results of the 2011 election.

August 2016 election

The following table shows the results of the 2016 election.

November 2021 election

The following table shows the results of the 2021 election.

By-elections from November 2021
The following by-elections were held to fill vacant ward seats in the period since November 2021.

References

Ntabankulu
Elections in the Eastern Cape
Alfred Nzo District Municipality